Amélie Mauresmo was the defending champion, but lost in second round to Anne Kremer.

Venus Williams won the title by defeating Justine Henin 2–6, 7–5, 7–6(7–5) in the final.

Seeds
The first eight seeds received a bye into the second round.

Draw

Finals

Top half

Section 1

Section 2

Bottom half

Section 3

Section 4

External links
 Official results archive (ITF)
 Official results archive (WTA)

Bausch and Lomb Championships - Singles
Singles